Q54 may refer to:
 Q54 (New York City bus)
 Al-Qamar, a surah of the Quran